Mustafabad may refer to:

 Mustafabad, Delhi
 Mustafabad, Faisalabad
 Mustafabad, Lahore
 Mustafaabad (Dullewala) District Bhakkar

See also
 Mostufaabad